The Big Bull is a 2021 Indian Hindi-language financial thriller film directed and written by Kookie Gulati, based on stockbroker Harshad Mehta who was involved in financial crimes over a period of 10 years during 1980–1990. The film stars Abhishek Bachchan, Ileana D'Cruz and Nikita Dutta. It entered production in September 2019, and was digitally released on 8 April 2021 on Disney+ Hotstar. The film received mixed reviews, praising Bachchan's performance, but criticized in comparison to the much acclaimed Scam 1992, which was also based on Mehta's life. It currently has a rating of 5.7 on IMDb.

Plot 
'The Big Bull’ follows the life and times of Hemant Shah, a smalltime stockbroker, who manipulates the loopholes in the country's archaic banking system to create a massive bull run on the stock exchange. But at a time when the Indian economy was taking its big leap towards liberalisation,a girl named meera rao stopped his leap and got him arrested even though  he used the ace of hearts, the prime minister of India. He was still found guilty.

Cast 
 Abhishek Bachchan as Hemant Shah (based on Harshad Mehta)
 Ileana D'Cruz as Meera Rao (based on Sucheta Dalal)
 Nikita Dutta as Priya Patel Shah (based on Jyoti Mehta)
 Sumit Vats as Hari Vyas
 Mahesh Manjrekar as Rana Sawant
 Ram Kapoor as Ashok Mirchandani, Hemant's lawyer (based on Ram Jethmalani)
 Sohum Shah as Viren Shah, Hemant's brother, based on Ashwin Mehta
 Lekha Prajapati as Tara Shah, Viren's wife
 Supriya Pathak as Amiben Shah, Hemant's mother
 Sanjeev Pandey
 Saurabh Shukla as Mannu Malpani, Chairman of Bombay Stock Exchange
 Samir Soni as Sanjeev Kohli
 Shishir Sharma as Rajesh Mishra, Meera's Boss
 Hitesh Rawal as Kantilal
 Kanan Arunachalam as Venkateshwar
 Rio Kapadia as NCC MD Singh
 Trupti Shankadhar as Ashima
 Abhijit Lahiri as Baldev
 Anand Goradia as CBI Officer Nikhil 
 Pankaj Vishnu as CBI officer Dheeraj
 Rohit Tiwari as CBI officer Rakesh
 Sanjiv Jotangia as Mr. Patel, Priya Patel's Father
 Aarjav Trivedi as Priya Patel's Fiancé
 Vijay Rajoria as Raman
 Akhil Vaid as Vikram Solanki

Production 
In 2018, it was reported that Ajay Devgn will produce the film with Abhishek Bachchan playing the lead role. The film is directed by Kookie Gulati and shows the financial crimes and life of Harshad Mehta. Nikita Dutta and Ileana D'Cruz were brought in to play supporting roles.

The shooting commenced on 16 September 2019. Many shots of the movie has been filmed in Gautam Buddha University.

Release
Due to the COVID-19 pandemic, the film was released for streaming worldwide from 8 April 2021 on Hotstar.

Soundtrack 

The film's music was composed by Gourov Dasgupta and Mehul Vyas with lyrics written by Kunwar Juneja and Anil Verma. The rap single "Yalgaar" by CarryMinati, with music by Wily Frenzy, served as the theme song. Sandeep Shirodkar composed the background score.

Reception
Saibal Chatterjee of NDTV rated the movie 1.5 out of 5 stars commenting that “the film's problems are rooted in the screenplay, stilted dialogues and arbitrary character arcs.” Writing for Film Companion, Rahul Desai called the movie a “rushed portrait of a slow-burned legacy” further adding that “Abhishek Bachchan’s version of Harshad Mehta is far more compelling than the story it defines”. Jyoti Kanyal of India Today gave the movie 2.5 out of 5 stars calling it “an interesting watch, which often oscillates between boredom and excitement.”

Ronak Kotecha of Times of India graded the film with 3 out of 5 stars and asked not to let the 'stock of expectations rise too high'. He opined that Abhishek Bachchan 'delivered a decent performance'. In conclusion of review he wrote, "Overall, The Big Bull is a decent attempt to tell a dramatic story of one of India’s biggest financial scams, orchestrated by a man, who seemed more like a common man than a con man."

References

External links
 
 

Cultural depictions of fraudsters
Films set in the 1990s
Indian films based on actual events
Indian crime drama films
Indian biographical films
Films not released in theaters due to the COVID-19 pandemic
Disney+ Hotstar original films